Count Lajos Tisza de Borosjenő et Szeged (12 September 1832 - 26 January 1898) was a Hungarian politician, who served as Minister besides the King between 1892 and 1894. He was the younger brother of Kálmán Tisza and uncle of István Tisza. Tisza took part in the Hungarian politics from 1861, he was a supporter of the Austro-Hungarian Compromise of 1867. After the great flood at Szeged in 1879 he was the responsible for the reconstruction of the town. Szeged regards him as a hero since then because Lajos Tisza conducted the performance of the complicated task of the town's reconstruction with distinguished cooperation and a good organizational skill. Lajos Tisza received the title of Count from Emperor Franz Joseph for his works in the reconstruction of Szeged in 1883. However, the childless Lajos Tisza conferred his title on his politician nephew Stephen Tisza with the consent of the Monarch on 16 February 1897.

Until his death, he was the chairman of the National Association of Forestry. In Szeged, the Lajos Tisza Boulevard and the Széchenyi Square's sculpture cherishes his memory. The sculpture prepared by János Fadrusz in 1904, who said this about his masterpiece: "I will characterize junior Hungary, today's Hungary with this sculpture, not only Lajos Tisza. The heroes of the work are today's Hungary's heroes. That's why symbolic is the town of Szeged's story, our good king and our nation dared resolute and not slackened was reborne with his work."

References

 Magyar Életrajzi Lexikon
Biography
Biography

1832 births
1898 deaths
Counts of Hungary
Hungarian nobility
People from Oradea
Foreign ministers of Hungary
Public Works and Transport ministers of Hungary
Lajos, Tisza
Lord-lieutenants of a county in Hungarian Kingdom